José Luis Mendilibar Etxebarria (born 14 March 1961) is a Spanish former footballer who played as a midfielder, currently a manager.

He played no higher than Segunda División, where he made 290 appearances and scored 34 goals mainly for Sestao and also for Logroñés. He managed for over 15 years in La Liga for Athletic Bilbao, Valladolid, Osasuna, Levante, Eibar and Alavés, winning the second division with the second of those teams in 2006–07.

Playing career
Mendilibar was born in Zaldibar, Basque Country. He enjoyed an average career as a player, never appearing for a club in La Liga and successively representing Bilbao Athletic, CD Logroñés, Sestao Sport Club and SD Lemona.

Mendilibar was a key player in midfield for Sestao during the side's second division years – playing eight seasons with them in that level and appearing in nearly 300 competitive matches – narrowly missing out on promotion in 1986–87 under Javier Irureta.

Coaching career
After retiring in 1994, Mendilibar worked in the youth categories of Athletic Bilbao before being appointed head coach of UD Lanzarote and then SD Eibar. His success with the latter in the second division, on a very limited budget, translated into a narrow miss on promotion in 2005.

Mendilibar then returned to Athletic, the club he supported as a child. He was sacked after a few months, as the Lions were eliminated from the Intertoto Cup in the opening round and were bottom of the league with just one win in nine matches.

For the 2006–07 season, Mendilibar moved to Real Valladolid, achieving top-flight promotion (with 88 points) and retaining league status from 2007 to 2009. On 1 February 2010, after a 1–1 home draw against UD Almería, he was dismissed.

Slightly less than one year later, Mendilibar returned to work, replacing the fired José Antonio Camacho at CA Osasuna. His first game in charge was a 4–0 home win against RCD Espanyol, on 20 February 2011. On 3 September 2013, he was relieved of his duties after three losses in as many matches to kickstart the new season.

On 29 May 2014, Mendilibar was appointed at Levante UD, signing a one-year contract with an option for a second season. On 20 October, after only one win in eight games, and no goals scored and 14 conceded from four home fixtures, he was dismissed.

Mendilibar returned to Eibar on 30 June 2015, replacing Gaizka Garitano. In 2016–17, he led the team to a best-ever quarter-final finish in the Copa del Rey before an injury-stripped squad lost 5–2 on aggregate to Atlético Madrid; he and Asier Garitano of CD Leganés were joint recipients of the year's Miguel Muñoz Trophy for best manager. The following year they came ninth in the league, again a club record.

In May 2021, shortly after the team's relegation, Mendilibar announced that he would not renew his contract at Eibar. At the turn of the calendar year, he returned to the top division at relegation-threatened neighbours Deportivo Alavés, being fired less than four months later with the side in last place.

Managerial statistics

References

External links

Athletic Bilbao manager profile

1961 births
Living people
People from Durangaldea
Sportspeople from Biscay
Spanish footballers
Footballers from the Basque Country (autonomous community)
Association football midfielders
Segunda División players
Segunda División B players
Bilbao Athletic footballers
CD Logroñés footballers
Sestao Sport Club footballers
SD Lemona footballers
Spanish football managers
La Liga managers
Segunda División managers
Segunda División B managers
Tercera División managers
CD Basconia managers
Athletic Bilbao B managers
SD Eibar managers
Athletic Bilbao managers
Real Valladolid managers
CA Osasuna managers
Levante UD managers
Deportivo Alavés managers